Nafti may refer to:

Given name
 Abdelkarim Nafti, Tunisian footballer
 Bassem Nafti, Tunisian footballer
 Mehdi Nafti, Tunisian footballer

See also
 National Film and Television Institute

Arabic-language surnames